Carlos Gael Acosta Zavala (born 26 March 1992) is a Mexican professional footballer who plays as a midfielder.

Playing career
Acosta was discovered by C.F. Monterrey while playing in a national U16 tournament in 2008. He played for their developmental team, Rayados de Monterrey, and made his first team debut on 4 May 2013, coming on as a 72' substitute for Omar Arellano in a 5–1 loss against Cruz Azul. He scored his first professional goal on August 21, 2013, during a Copa MX match against Altamira with a 68' left-footed strike.

He was loaned out to Atlante in December 2013, along with Luis Madrigal, and spent six months with the Cancún team before returning in June.

Honours
Monterrey
CONCACAF Champions League: 2012–13

Morelia
Liga de Expansión MX: Clausura 2022

References

External links

Gael Acosta at CF Monterrey profile
Gael Acosta at FoxSports stats

1992 births
Living people
Association football wingers
Mexico youth international footballers
C.F. Monterrey players
Atlante F.C. footballers
Correcaminos UAT footballers
Alebrijes de Oaxaca players
Querétaro F.C. footballers
Venados F.C. players
Atlético Morelia players
Liga MX players
Ascenso MX players
Liga de Expansión MX players
Liga Premier de México players
Tercera División de México players
Footballers from Sinaloa
Sportspeople from Los Mochis
Mexican footballers